Subterranean is the first EP by Swedish heavy metal band In Flames, released in 1995. It was remastered and re-released in 2003 by Regain Records and reissued again in 2014, featuring additional tracks. The song "The Inborn Lifeless" is also featured on the album The Jester Race, but with a different name ("Dead God in Me"), different lyrics, an alternate ending, and a slightly different solo. Although drummer Daniel Erlandsson is pictured with the band through certain parts of the EP, he was only a guest, and did not perform on all of the recording.

Track listing

Personnel
In Flames
Henke Forss – lead vocals
Glenn Ljungström – lead guitar
Jesper Strömblad – rhythm guitar, acoustic guitar
Johann Larsson – bass, backing vocals

Guests
Anders Fridén – vocals on "Murders in the Rue Morgue"
Jocke Götberg – vocals on "Dead Eternity"
Per Gyllenbäck – vocals on "The Inborn Lifeless"
Robert Dahne – vocals on "Eye of the Beholder"
Oscar Dronjak – backing vocals on "Stand Ablaze"
Daniel Erlandsson – drums on tracks 1, 2, 6-9
Anders Jivarp – drums on tracks 3, 5

Other
Fredrik Nordström – engineering
Staffan Olofsson – mastering
Kenneth Johansson – cover art and photos
Henke Forss – lyrics

Source:

References

External links
Subterranean releases information on discogs 
Subterranean album details
Subterranean information

In Flames albums
1995 EPs